Qira County, alternatively Chira or Cele (from Mandarin Chinese), is a county in Hotan Prefecture, Xinjiang Uyghur Autonomous Region, China. Almost all the residents of the county are Uyghurs and live around oases situated between the desolate Taklamakan Desert and Kunlun Mountains. The county is bordered to the north by Aksu Prefecture, to the east by Yutian / Keriya County, to the northwest by Lop County, to the southwest by Hotan County including the China-India disputed Aksai Chin area and to the south by Rutog County, Ngari Prefecture in Tibet.

History
The sixth century Dandan Oilik oasis town archaeological site where Buddhist shrines and texts were discovered is located in the desert of northern Qira (Chira) County.

Qira town (Chira), the town that is the current county seat of Qira County, has been forced to change locations on three occasions due to encroachment by the sands of the Taklamakan Desert.

In his 1900-01 expedition in the region, Aurel Stein travelled across the northern section of today's Qira County, a section of the Taklamakan Desert between today's Lop County and the Keriya River. There were several wells along the course he took.

Qira County was divided from Yutian / Keriya County in 1928/9.

In the thirty years between the 1950s and 1980s, a significant area of farmland near the county seat was taken into the desert by blown sand.

Since the founding of Xinjiang Autonomous Region in 1955, Qira County has been part of Hotan Prefecture.

In the 1980s, 446 households living in the county seat were forced to relocate due to the effects of desertification which had brought the Taklamakan Desert within  km of their homes, sometimes burying homes in sand overnight.

In 1983, the Qira research station of the Chinese Academy of Sciences was founded to combat drift sand.

In 2005, a small 1,500 year-old Buddhist temple was discovered  from Damiku (Damagou).

On October 20, 2014, Damiku (Damagou) was changed from a township to a town.

On January 7, 2016, areas near Nur, Bostan and Ulughsay townships in Qira County were made part of the newly created Kunyu.

On February 28, 2017, it was announced by the county government that those who reported others for stitching the 'star and crescent moon' insignia on their clothing or personal items or having the words 'East Turkestan' on their mobile phone case, purse or other jewelry, would be eligible for cash payments.

In March 2017, Salamet Memetimin, the Communist Party secretary for Chaka township's Bekchan village and ethnic Uyghur, was relieved of her duties for taking her nikah marriage vows at her home. According to the Hotan Daily, 97 officials were charged with disciplinary violations at this time.

In 2018, local government authorities in the county expected to have almost 12,000 detainees in vocational camps and detention centres and some projects related to the centres outstripped budgetary limits.

According to the Chinese Government, by the end of 2018, construction of Jinnan New Village in Qira Town (Cele) was completed.
To increase aid delivery to Xinjiang, places in Xinjiang are paired with other areas of China which can provide aid. Tianjin and Hotan are paired in this program. Through assistance from the Tianjin government, a standard football field and training center was constructed at the No. 1 Primary School in the county.

Geography
The northern part of Qira County is made up of sand dunes and ends in a straight line drawn in the Taklamakan Desert that forms part of the boundary between Hotan Prefecture and Aksu Prefecture.

Oasis areas occupy 2.9% of the total area of the county. The oasis areas along China National Highway 315 include the Qira County county seat area, Gulahma and Damiku. Qaka, Ulughsay, Nur, Bostan and Kunyu's small exclaves in Qira County are located close to the Kunlun Mountains.

The upper reaches of the White Jade River (Yurung Kash), which provide water for Hotan (Khotan), are found in the Kunlun Mountains of southern Qira County. Mountain passes in the area include Mandar Kol Dawan, Shalgon Dawan, Kuchkash Bulak Dawan, and Art Dawan. The meltwater from this mountain creates the Qira River (Cele River, Ts'e-lo Ho) which flows through Qaka into the Qira county seat.

In the mid-20th century, camping grounds in the sparsely populated southern mountainous area of the county included Chotma, Yangi kan, Zaiuk, Yaskako Tagh, Mandar Chap, and Chumik.

Climate

Administrative divisions
Qira County includes two towns and six townships and one other area:

Towns:
Qira (Cele, Chira;  / ), Gulahma (Gulahema, Gulakhma, Gulahama;  / , formerly )

Townships:
Qira (Cele, Chira;  / ), Damiku (Damagou, Ta-mu-kou, Ha-lang-kou, Dumuka;  / ), Qaka  (Qiaha, Chaqa, Ch'i-ko-erh, Ch'ia-ha;  / ), Ulughsay (Wulukesayi;  / ), Nur (Nu'er, Nuri;  / ), Bostan (Bositan;  / )

Other:
 Regiment One Pasture (part of Kunyu)

Economy
Agricultural products of the county include wheat, corn, cotton, petroleum products, melons, pomegranates, walnuts, peaches, and apricots. Livestock raised in the county include horses, cows and sheep. Industry in the country includes electronics, construction, cotton ginning and food processing (fruits).

Demographics

As of 2015, 163,705 of the 166,735 residents of the county were Uyghur, 2,921 were Han Chinese and 109 were from other ethnic groups.

As of the 2010s, the population of Qira County was more than 98% Uyghur.

As of 1999, 98.45% of the population of Qira (Cele) County was Uyghur and 1.51% of the population was Han Chinese.

Transportation
 China National Highway 315 runs through the Qira County county seat, Gulahma and Damiku.

Notable persons
 Ismail Amat, former Chairman (Governor) of Xinjiang

Gallery

Notes

References

County-level divisions of Xinjiang
Hotan Prefecture